Brown Mountain is a summit in western St. Francois County in the U.S. state of Missouri. The community of Iron Mountain Lake lies just west of the mountain. The mountain is named after Mr. Brown, a businessperson in the local charcoal producing industry.

See also

 List of mountain peaks of Missouri

References

Mountains of St. Francois County, Missouri
Mountains of Missouri